The 2021 Vuelta a Burgos Feminas was a road cycling stage race that took place in the province of Burgos in northern Spain between 20 and 23 May 2021. It was the sixth edition of the Vuelta a Burgos Feminas, and the first as a newly promoted event to the 2021 UCI Women's World Tour.

Teams 
Eight of the nine UCI Women's WorldTeams and twelve UCI Women's Continental Teams made up the twenty teams that participated the race.

UCI Women's WorldTeams

 
 
 
 
 
 
 
 

UCI Women's Continental Teams

Route

Stages

Stage 1 
20 May 2021 – Villadiego to Sargentes de la Lora,

Stage 2 
21 May 2021 – Pedrosa de Valdeporres to Villarcayo,

Stage 3 
22 May 2021 – Medina de Pomar to Ojo Guareña,

Stage 4 

Classification leadership table 

 On stage 2, Elise Chabbey, who was second in the points classification, wore the green jersey, because first placed Grace Brown wore the violet jersey as the leader of the general classification. For the same reason, on stage 2, Heidi Franz, who was second in the mountains classification, wore the red jersey.
 On stage 4, Cecilie Uttrup Ludwig, who was second in the mountains classification, wore the red jersey, because first placed Niamh Fisher-Black wore the violet jersey as the leader of the general classification. For the same reason, on stage 4, Évita Muzic, who was second in the young rider classification, wore the white jersey.

Final classification standings

General classification

Points classification

Mountains classification

Young rider classification

Spanish rider classification

Team classification

Notes

References

Sources

External links 
 

Vuelta a Burgos Feminas
Vuelta a Burgos Feminas
Vuelta a Burgos Feminas